Hirotake Maeda is Professor of History at the Faculty of Humanities and Social Sciences of Tokyo Metropolitan University. He specializes in Middle Eastern Studies, Eurasian Studies, and the histories of Iran and the Caucasus. He focuses in particular on the origins of the gholam (also spelled ghulam) military "slaves" of Safavid Iran and their role and position in Iran's history, using Persian and Georgian sources.

Selected publications

References

Living people

Year of birth missing (living people) 
Academic staff of Tokyo Metropolitan University
Middle Eastern studies scholars
Iranologists
Kartvelian studies scholars
21st-century Japanese historians
Historians of Iran
Historians of Georgia (country)